Köping is a locality and the seat of Köping Municipality in Västmanland County, Sweden. It had 17,743 inhabitants in 2010. It is known for the television series I en annan del av Köping.

Etymology 
Köping means merchant place. It was mentioned for the first time in the 13th century. It was probably given such a name as it did not yet have a charter. The central location of Köping deems it appropriate for merchancy for people from different parts of the country.

History 

People have lived on the site for a long time, which is evident not least from the Viking-age boat burial ground at Norsa. An old trading post has been located near Köping. It is first mentioned in a document from the year 1257, when a bishops' meeting was held on the site. Köping, with central and southern Sweden was сhristianised in the 11th century.  A church built around the year 1300, the Köping Church, still remains from the early days. Köping has been known as a city since 1349 when its city seal was invoked in a letter.  

At Köping was the bailiff's stronghold Köpingshus, mentioned for the first time in 1375 and destroyed by Engelbrekt Engelbrektsson's revolt in 1434. Köping got its charter on January 19, 1474. Köpingshus was rebuilt in the 1580s during Johan III's reign. Charles IX continued the work but later the work ceased and the bail had to lapse. In the 1660s, only ruins remained. Remains remained until the railway was built. Even in the 15th century, the name Laglösa kiöping still appears, which probably means that the trading post had no privileges. 

The city's oldest church is probably a church dedicated to St. Olof, which was located after the current Mullgatan. The church appears to have been in poor condition in the early 15th century and then fell into disrepair and was demolished in the 1440s. After the current Köping church was ravaged by fire in 1437, it was given a size sufficient after the rebuilding to suffice for both the county and city parish. 

In 1641, Queen Kristina Prästgärdet was donated east of the river to plots, and gradually the "new city" grew here with its own square, Hökartorget or Lilla torget. In the 17th century Köping municipality produced large amounts of iron that was transported to other countries.

In the 19th century Köping established itself as an industrial city, with a large mechanical workshop and a prosperous harbor. A fire in 1889 destroyed large parts of Köping, whereafter it was rebuilt using stone material under supervision of architect Theodor Dahl.

In the 20th century all kinds of companies have established themselves in Köping. Volvo built a large industry there in the 1920s; the arguably most known bed manufacturer in Sweden, Hästens, in 1924; and a number of gold groceries between 1940 — 1960.

Gallery

Sports
The following sports clubs are located in Köping:

 Forsby FF, association football club
 IBK Köping, floorball club
 IK Westmannia Frisk, athletics and ski club
 IKW/Köping BK, bowling club
 Köping FF, association football club
 Köping HC, ice hockey club
 Köping UBBK, basketball club
 Köpings BTK, table tennis club
 Köpings GF, gymnastics and cheerleading club
 Köpings IS, association club, bandy and football
 Köpings RK, riding club
 Köpings SS, swimming club
 Köpings TK, tennis and padel club
 Köping/Kolsva OK, orienteering club

Notable natives 
 Carl Wilhelm Scheele — 18th century chemist who discovered the functions of oxygen.
 Richard Dybeck — One of the writers of the Swedish national anthem.
 Henrik Sjögren — Ophthalmologist best known for the eponymous condition Sjögren's syndrome.
 Emir Bajrami — Plays in the Swedish national football team.
 Charta 77 (band) — Swedish punk rock band.
 Johan Gustafsson — Plays professional ice hockey, drafted by Minnesota Wild, plays in Iowa Wild.
 Agda Östlund (1870-1942) suffragist and social democrat

References 

Municipal seats of Västmanland County
Swedish municipal seats
Populated lakeshore places in Sweden
Populated places in Västmanland County
Populated places in Köping Municipality
Market towns in Sweden